Joo Jae-Duk  (born 25 July 1985) is a South Korean football player who formerly played for Gyeongnam FC, Jeonbuk Hyundai Motors and Daegu FC in the K-League.

Club career
A reserve goalkeeper, Joo saw little first team play with Gyeongnam FC and latterly Jeonbuk Hyundai Motors.  On 4 January 2011, it was announced that he is to join Daegu FC for the 2011 K-League season. However, he was released from the club in July.

References

External links 

1985 births
Living people
South Korean footballers
Gyeongnam FC players
Jeonbuk Hyundai Motors players
Daegu FC players
K League 1 players
Association football goalkeepers